Daniele Cherniak is a geochemist known for her work on using particle beams for geochemical analysis on small scales. She was elected a fellow of the American Geophysical Union in 2021.

Education and career 
Cherniak grew up in Cohoes, New York and went to Keveny Memorial Academy. In 1983, Cherniak received her  undergraduate degree from Union College and went on to earn her Ph.D. in physics at the University at Albany, SUNY in 1990. As of 2021, she is a research professor at Rensselaer Polytechnic Institute and works at the Ion Beam Lab at the University at Albany.

Research 
Cherniak is known for her research on rock-forming minerals, specifically on atomic diffusion in these minerals. She established the use of ion implantation to place lead into minerals followed by the use of Rutherford backscattering spectrometry to obtain diffusion profiles, which she first applied to measurements in apatite and zircon, and has subsequently applied to other minerals. She has also examined the diffusion of rare-earth elements, tetravalent cations, and oxygen into zircon. Her work on argon showed that the degassing of Earth is slower than expected. Much of her work is collaborative projects with E. Bruce Watson. In 2020, she began a project working with scientists Union College on a study of radioactive decay which will improve both disposal of nuclear waste and increase precision of dating material that is billions of years old.

Selected publications

Awards and honors 

 Fellow, Geochemical Society (2010)
 Fellow, American Geophysical Union (2021)
 Walt Westman Award, National Organization of Gay and Lesbian Scientists and Technical Professionals (2021)

Personal life 
Cherniak started running cross country while in high school and continued to run while at Union College. Cherniak runs in ultramarathons and has earned team bronze medals in 1998 and 2000 in the IAU 100 km World Championships. Her local running club, Hudson Mohawk Road Runners Club, elected her to their hall of fame for her running accomplishments, the first woman to receive this honor.

Cherniak also volunteers for the Spindle City Historic Society in Cohoes, New York and has been recognized for her work in historic preservation in the area, especially in the restoration of parts of the Erie Canal.

References

External links 

 , August 15, 2021 interview

Fellows of the American Geophysical Union
Living people
University at Albany, SUNY alumni
Rensselaer Polytechnic Institute faculty
Long-distance runners
Women physicists
Geochemists
1961 births
American LGBT scientists